Carroll L. Wilson (September 21, 1910 – January 12, 1983; aged 72) was a Professor of Management at the Sloan School and the first Mitsui Professor in Problems of Contemporary Technology at MIT. His career encompassed a number of academic, government, and industrial positions ranging from Assistant to the President of MIT to first General Manager of the Atomic Energy Commission.

Among Wilson's many accomplishments was the establishment of the MIT African Fellows Program (1960–1967) and the MIT Fellows in Latin America Program (1965–1967), which allowed talented MIT graduates to partner with and assist emerging independent nations by working directly in their governmental agencies.

References

https://web.archive.org/web/20161017220335/https://gecd.mit.edu/go-abroad/distinguished-fellowships/explore-fellowships/carroll-l-wilson
http://www.nytimes.com/1983/01/13/obituaries/carroll-l-wilson-science-and-energy-expert.html
https://mobile.nytimes.com/1950/08/10/archives/wilson-decries-talk-of-aec-shakeup.html
The Human Radiation Experiments
http://archives.aaas.org/golden/doc.php?gold_id=127
http://archives.aaas.org/golden/doc.php?gold_id=58
Bulletin of the Atomic Scientists June 1979
https://web.archive.org/web/20011104062737/http://entrepreneurship.mit.edu/wilson/legacy.html
https://web.archive.org/web/20011105203329/http://entrepreneurship.mit.edu/wilson/techreview.html

MIT Sloan School of Management faculty
1910 births
1983 deaths